West Riding most commonly refers to: 

West Riding of Yorkshire, one of three former administrative counties making up Yorkshire in England.

West Riding may also refer to:

Government
West Riding County Council
Eastern West Riding of Yorkshire (UK Parliament constituency)
West Riding of Yorkshire, a UK Parliamentary constituency that existed from 1832 – 1865

1952 West Riding County Council election
1955 West Riding County Council election

Military
West Riding Artillery
West Riding Heavy Battery, Royal Garrison Artillery
West Riding Yeomanry –Two cavalry regiments formed in 1794, disbanded at the Peace of Amiens in 1802, consisting of:
Southern Regiment of West Riding Yeomanry was reformed in 1803 and became the Yorkshire Dragoons in 1889.
Northern Regiment of West Riding Yeomanry was reformed in 1802 and became the Yorkshire Hussars in 1819.

Organizations & Other
West Riding Automobile Company, a subsidiary of the Yorkshire (West Riding) Electric Tramways Company which began operating in 1922
West Riding House, a 20 storey commercial building
West Riding Limited, a named passenger train that began service in 1937
Stanley Royd Hospital, earlier the West Riding Paupers Lunatic Asylum, a facility that operated from 1818 to 1995.

Places
West Riding of Lindsey, a former subdivision of Lincolnshire, England
West Riding of County Cork in Ireland
West Riding of County Galway in Ireland

Sports
West Riding County Amateur Football League 
West Riding County Womens Football League
West Riding County Cup
West Riding County Football Association